Cosmic mass may mean:

 mass of the cosmos, see Mass of the observable universe
 Cosmic mass distribution, see Cosmic microwave background radiation and Large-scale structure of the cosmos
 Cosmic mass density, see Shape of the universe
 Cosmic mass field, see Metric expansion of space
 Cosmic mass function, see Friedmann equations
Techno-Cosmic Mass, a religious and musical event, promoted by Matthew Fox